Tridentiger kuroiwae is a species of goby endemic to Japan where it is found in flowing fresh waters.

References

External links 

kuroiwae
Fish of the Pacific Ocean
Fish of Japan
Fish described in 1927
Taxa named by David Starr Jordan